is a Fantasy comedy anime series and the second installment to Bandai Namco's Cocotama Series, following the 2015 series Kamisama Minarai: Himitsu no Cocotama. Directed by Norio Nitta and written by Michihiro Tsuchiya with character design drafts from Yuka Fujiwara and character designs from Shinobu Ookawa and Shouji Yasukazu. The series premiered in all TXN stations in Japan from September 6, 2018 to September 26, 2019, replacing Kamisama Minarai: Himitsu no Cocotama: Natsu Da! Ōhashagi Special in its initial timeslot.

The series revolves around Haruka Hoshinogawa, a fifth grade student and resident of Sakura Town. Long time ago, she made a wish with the town's old Cherry Blossom tree with her grandfather while receiving a present from him: a cherry blossom ribbon. As she grew up, she treasured the gift that was given to her while starting fifth grade in her school. One day, upon noting that the old cherry blossom tree is wilting, her grandfather decided to leave the shop to explore the world and let Haruka take care of the store in his absence. The next day while sleeping, her treasured ribbon sprouted a strange egg, revealing a Cocotama, a god born from an object that has been cherished with love and care. Haruka woke up and accidentally saw the Cocotama on the table, retreated to her Hiding Egg. As Haruka picked it up, it has changed into a mysterious key. Left with some questions, the Cocotama introduced herself as Ribbon and Haruka learned about the existence of her kind and the mysteries behind the strange key she had. Ribbon realized that the key is actually the Key of Wonders, and that Haruka was chosen by it to be the Legendary Contractor to the Cocotamas. Now, both of them try to run the shop and meet new Cocotama friends, while discovering the mysteries and powers behind the Key of Wonders.

The music for the sequel is composed by Ken Itō (Handa-Kun) and Kenichi Kuroda. The series's opening theme is titled  by Minami Takahashi, Inori Minase, Mariya Ise and Emiri Iwai while the first ending song is titled  by Kaoru Masaki. Later, replaced by second ending song is titled  by Kaoru Masaki and Erika.

Episode List

References 

General
 http://www.tv-tokyo.co.jp/anime/cocotama/trailer/
 http://www.tv-tokyo.co.jp/anime/cocotama/episodes/

Specific

Kira Kira Happy Hirake! Cocotama
Cocotama